Chuck Davis may refer to:

 Charles Davis (basketball, born 1984), naturalized Azerbaijani basketball player
 Chuck Davis (businessman) (born 1960), Internet entrepreneur
Chuck Davis (diver), an underwater diver  recognized for his achievements by the NOGI Awards
 Chuck Davis (dancer) (1937–2017), African-American dancer, choreographer, and founder of several dance groups

See also
Charles Davis (disambiguation)